The Last Whistle is an American sports drama film, written and directed by Rob Smat. It stars Brad Leland as a stern football coach who must contend with tragedy after a player's death from hypertrophic cardiomyopathy.

It was released on June 28, 2019 by Vertical Entertainment.

Cast
 Brad Leland as Coach Victor Trenton
 Jim O'Heir as Ted
 Les Miles as Billy
 Eric Nelsen as Greg Reid
 Fred Tolliver, Jr. as Benny
 Deanne Lauvin as Theresa
 Tyler Perez as Mark
 Sainty Nelsen as Sarah Trenton
 Chelly as Ford

Production
In May 2018, it was announced Brad Leland, Jim O'Heir, Les Miles, and Eric Nelsen joined the cast of the film, with Rob Smat directing from his own screenplay. The film was shot on location in Fort Worth, Texas. The film marks one of the rare acting appearances of former national championship winning football coach Les Miles.

Release
In November 2018, the film premiered as the opening night film of Fort Worth's Lone Star Film Festival. In February 2019, Vertical Entertainment acquired distribution rights to the film. It was released on June 28, 2019.

References

External links

2019 films
2010s sports drama films
American sports drama films
Vertical Entertainment films
2010s English-language films
2010s American films